The Malaysian Malay-language television mystery music game show I Can See Your Voice Malaysia premiered the second season on TV3 on 23 June 2019.

Gameplay

Format
Under the original format, the guest artist can eliminate one or two mystery singers after each round. The game concludes with the last mystery singer standing which depends on the outcome of a duet performance with a guest artist.

Rewards
If the singer is good, he/she will perform again in the post-season encore concert episode; if the singer is bad, he/she wins .

Rounds
Each episode presents the guest artist with six people whose identities and singing voices are kept concealed until they are eliminated to perform on the "stage of truth" or remain in the end to perform the final duet.

Episodes

Guest artists

Panelists

Encore Concert (29 September 2019)
In the season finale, this episode includes an encore concert that featured winning good singers returning to perform one last time. The ending credits shown a music video from Mu'izz's single, "Andai Nanti".

Notes

References

I Can See Your Voice Malaysia
2019 Malaysian television seasons